Indium phosphide (InP) is a binary semiconductor composed of indium and phosphorus. It has a face-centered cubic ("zincblende") crystal structure, identical to that of GaAs and most of the III-V semiconductors.

Manufacturing

Indium phosphide can be prepared from the reaction of white phosphorus and indium iodide at 400 °C., also by direct combination of the purified elements at high temperature and pressure, or by thermal decomposition of a mixture of a trialkyl indium compound and phosphine.

Applications
The application fields of InP splits up into three main areas. It is used as the basis for optoelectronic components, high-speed electronics, and photovoltaics

High-speed optoelectronics
InP is used as a substrate for epitaxial optoelectronic devices based other semiconductors, such as indium gallium arsenide. The devices include pseudomorphic heterojunction bipolar transistors that could operate at 604 GHz.

InP itself has a direct bandgap, making it useful for optoelectronics devices like laser diodes and photonic integrated circuits for the optical telecommunications industry, to enable wavelength-division multiplexing applications.  It used in high-power and high-frequency electronics because of its superior electron velocity with respect to the more common semiconductors silicon and gallium arsenide. It is used in lasers, sensitive photodetectors and modulators in the wavelength window typically used for telecommunications, i.e., 1550 nm wavelengths, as it is a direct bandgap III-V compound semiconductor material. The wavelength between about 1510 nm and 1600 nm has the lowest attenuation available on optical fibre (about 0.2 dB/km).

Photovoltaics and optical sensing
InP can be used in photonic integrated circuits that can generate, amplify, control and detect laser light. 

Optical sensing applications of InP include 
Air pollution control by real-time detection of gases (CO, CO2, NOX [or NO + NO2], etc.).
Quick verification of traces of toxic substances in gases and liquids, including tap water, or surface contaminations.
Spectroscopy for non-destructive control of product, such as food. Researchers of Eindhoven University of Technology and MantiSpectra have already demonstrated the application of an integrated near-infrared spectral sensor for milk. In addition, it has been proven that this technology can also be applied to plastics and illicit drugs.

References

Cited sources

External links
Extensive site on the physical properties of indium phosphide (Ioffe institute)
Band structure and carrier concentration of InP.
InP conference series at IEEE
Indium Phosphide: Transcending frequency and integration limits. Semiconductor TODAY Compounds&AdvancedSilicon • Vol. 1 • Issue 3 • September 2006

Phosphides
Indium compounds
Inorganic phosphorus compounds
Optoelectronics
III-V semiconductors
III-V compounds
IARC Group 2A carcinogens
Zincblende crystal structure